Le Guess Who? is a Dutch music festival featuring different music genres: from avant-garde, jazz, hip hop, electronic, experimental, noise rock, indie rock, world music and others. The festival, founded by Bob van Heur and Johan Gijsen, has been hosted in the city of Utrecht since 2007. The festival takes place in various venues such as theaters, club venues, churches, galleries and warehouses across the city. The 14th edition of the festival took place on November 11–14, 2021, in the city of Utrecht (Netherlands). It features Phil Elverum (Mount Eerie), Matana Roberts, John Dwyer (musician) (Thee Oh Sees), Midori Takada and Lucrecia Dalt as curators; the initial line-up includes SPAZA, Bohren & der Club of Gore, Black Country, New Road, Low (band), The Necks and Alabaster DePlume.

History
During four days in mid November, Le Guess Who? takes over the city center of Utrecht with over 200 performances in pop venues, theaters, churches, galleries and warehouses. Satellite events with music, film, visual art, photography and markets appear at cafés, hotels, restaurants, wharf cellars, the central square and the hidden corners of the city. Stages are the music venues of Utrecht (TivoliVredenburg, De Helling, EKKO, dB's, etc.), but also theaters, clubs and the main churches of the city (like for example the Dom Church and Jacobikerk).
The line-up consists of more than hundred acts that rarely perform in the Netherlands or acts that have their first show there. The first edition in 2007 only featured Canadian acts but nowadays the festival has many international acts that make an appearance. Le Guess Who? celebrates diversity and inclusivity, focusing on artists that feel the urge to explore and expand the boundaries of certain genres and it features non-western sounds, jazz, folk, ambient, drone, avant-garde, modern composed, as well as contemporary pop and rock culture, and many blended forms of these genres.

Since 2015, one or more guest curators present a part of the festival program. Previous curators include Devendra Banhart, Shabaka Hutchings and Moor Mother (2018); Perfume Genius, James Holden, Grouper (musician), Shabazz Palaces, Jerusalem in My Heart and Han Bennink (2017); Wilco, Savages (band), Julia Holter and Suuns (2016); Sunn O))) (2015). 
The last edition of the festival took place November 7–10, 2019 and the curators were Fatoumata Diawara, Iris van Herpen & Salvador Breed, Jenny Hval, The Bug (musician), Patrick Higgins (musician) and Moon Duo.

Programs

First Editions
Initially, the festival focused exclusively on bands from Canada. With the line-up of the third edition (2009) this tradition became less strict and bands from other countries also performed. In 2010, at the fourth edition, the premise of only Canadian avant-garde music was completely abandoned and the programmers began to focus on music from all over the world. The festival expanded by one day every year during the first years. In 2007 the festival lasted two days, three in 2008, four in 2009, five in 2010, again three days in 2011 and four days in the following years. 
The line ups of the first editions include:

2015 Program

2016 Program

2017 Program

2018 Program

2019 Program

Satellite events

Le Guess Who? includes several satellite events which take place around the festival in Utrecht, during the main program.

Lombok Festival: a freely accessible festival that celebrates the cultural diversity of the Lombok district, initiated in collaboration with various locations, musicians, key figures and residents of this part of Utrecht. During Lombok Festival, various performances and cultural activities are organized; besides music performances, there are exhibitions, poetry readings, lectures, dance performances and special collaborations.

Le Mini Who?: a spin-off festival of Le Guess Who?. It turns studios, cafes and art spaces of Utrecht into improvised venues for (mainly) Dutch underground acts to play.

Untitled: this satellite event explores the many artistic expressions and perspectives of the artists performing at Le Guess Who?, as well as the exhibitions curated by art and design organizations in Utrecht.

Other Projects

In addition to the regular program, Le Guess Who? organizes various free accessible satellite events and education projects. The project Le Feast creates a connection between the city of Utrecht and national and international festival visitors, who are guests for a brunch in several local living rooms.
The festival recently started an education program with schools, in and around Utrecht, where students immerse themselves in the background of a festival artist and create a visual work, then exhibited during the festival in TivoliVredenburg. 
In recent years the festival also became a productions unit that releases music records, live videos and more. Examples are Mount Eerie's live album "(after)" (recorded during the artist's live show at Le Guess Who?) the audiovisual project of Jerusalem in My Heart with a fifteen-piece ensemble from Beirut, or the collaboration between Circuit des Yeux and the Netherlands Chamber Orchestra.

References

External links
Official website
Dutch Article on VPRO's 3VOOR12
Review  of 2007 edition on  Drowned in Sound
Review of 2015 edition on FACT Magazine
Review of 2016 edition on The Quietus
Announcement of 2017 edition on The New York Times

Music festivals established in 2007
Rock festivals in the Netherlands
2007 establishments in the Netherlands
Events in Utrecht (city)
Electronic music festivals in the Netherlands
Indie rock festivals